Deja Entendu may refer to:
 Déjà Entendu, the second album from Long Island-based rock band Brand New, released in 2003
 Déjà entendu, a psychological term describing the experience of feeling sure that one has already heard something